Jeffrey O'Neill may refer to:
Jeffrey O'Neill (Guiding Light), a fictional character of the soap opera Guiding Light
Jeff O'Neill (born 1976), Canadian ice hockey player

See also
Jeffrey Hamet O'Neal, portrait painter
O'Neill (surname)